Tsang Sin-yan (born 23 September 1992) is a Hong Kong rugby union player. She was selected for Hong Kong's squad when they made their first Rugby World Cup appearance in 2017.

References 

1992 births
Living people
Hong Kong people
Hong Kong rugby union players
Hong Kong female rugby union players